This is a list of districts in the Indian state of West Bengal ranked by literacy rate as per provisional data of 2011 census.

With a literacy rate of 96.26% (male 90.69% and female 96.54%), above the national average of 90.04%, as per the 2011 Census, West Bengal ranks 20th amongst the 36 states and union territories in India in terms of literacy rate .

See also
 Indian states ranking by literacy rate

References

Districts ranked by literacy rate
Literacy in India